Kévin Renaut (born 28 April 1991) is a French footballer who plays as a defender for FC Villefranche.

Career
Renaut played professionally in Ligue 2 for Nîmes from 2015 to 2016. He made his debut on 16 January 2015 in a 2–0 victory over Valenciennes.

On 13 June 2019, Renaut joined FC Villefranche.

References

1991 births
Living people
Association football defenders
French footballers
Ligue 2 players
Championnat National players
Championnat National 2 players
Championnat National 3 players
FC Martigues players
US Pontet Grand Avignon 84 players
Nîmes Olympique players
Marignane Gignac Côte Bleue FC players
FC Villefranche Beaujolais players
Footballers from Marseille